AW Hainsworth & Sons, Ltd., formerly known as Abimelech Hainsworth are an English textile manufacturing company based in Pudsey, West Yorkshire. They are known for producing heavily milled wool fabrics such as melton and doeskin, and for supplying these to the British Army, most notably for the Red coat (military uniform) still worn ceremonially by certain British Army units, especially the Grenadier Guards, for whom Hainsworth are the exclusive supplier of scarlet wool cloth for grenadier tunics, navy blue for trousers, and grey for winter greatcoats.

Products 
The company are holders of a Royal Warrant of Appointment (United Kingdom). Both Charles, Prince of Wales and Prince William, Duke of Cambridge wore garments of Hainsworth cloth at their weddings. The late Prince Philip, Duke of Edinburgh was buried in a coffin made of Hainsworth wool, carried in an electric Land Rover. Prince Philip reportedly once asked Thomas Hainsworth what business he was in, and was told "textiles," to which the prince replied "Oh yes, a dying industry, isn't it?" In 2010, speaking a sustainability conference, Prince Charles joked “I have discovered a company that makes a woollen coffin — coffins, ladies and gentlemen, to die for."

Hainsworth also make fabric for the clothing industry, academic dress, for fire-retardant personal protective equipment, automobile upholstery, bakery conveyor belting, historical reenactment, baize for billiards tables and the casino industry, and for costume and staging.

History 
The firm were founded as a clothing business in 1783 by then fourteen-year-old Abimelech Hainsworth, later known as "Old Bim". In 1900, the founder's grandson, also named Abimelech Hainsworth, was running the mill when he suffered a head injury in an industrial accident and was treated at the Leeds General Infirmary, spending twelve weeks in the hospital's care. In 1909, Hainsworth's  wife made a donation equivalent to 60,000 GBP in present value, which was commemorated by a brass plaque. The plaque was subsequently placed in storage and lost until its re-discovery by hospital receptionist Ronnie Walsh in 2017. The plaque was taken to the Hainsworth premises and presented to Adam Hainsworth, a descendant of the original benefactors, in 2021.

The firm were until recently run by descendant Thomas Hainsworth, marking the seventh generation of the family involvement. In 2021, Hainsworth announced that he would step down from his role as director of the technical and transport interiors divisions in October, in favor of then-sales director Diane Simpson. Hainsworth retains an oversight role on the Family Council, which he helped to create in 2018. After reaching an early twenty-first century nadir, the British wool industry has seen an increased demand for its product. Thomas Hainsworth has stated that the firm has learned from past mistakes, and that shareholders have told him to focus on reinvesting in equipment to remain competitive, instead of taking profits out of the business.

References

Textile industry of England
Companies based in Leeds
Wool industry
Royal Warrant holders
18th-century establishments in England
1783 establishments in England